Deoli-Pulgaon Assembly constituency  is one of the 288 Vidhan Sabha (legislative assembly) constituencies in the state of Maharashtra in the western India. This constituency is one of the four Vidhan Sabha constituencies in Wardha district and comprises the entire Deoli tehsil including Pulgaon town and parts of the Wardha and Hinganghat tehsils of this district.

Deoli-Pulgaon Assembly constituency is part of the Wardha Lok Sabha constituency along with five other Vidhan Sabha segments, namely Wardha, Arvi and Hinganght in Wardha district and Dhamangon Railway and Morshi in Amravati district.

Members of Legislative Assembly

See also
 Deoli
 Pulgaon
 Wardha District
 List of constituencies of Maharashtra Vidhan Sabha
 Maharashtra Vidhan Sabha

References

Assembly constituencies of Maharashtra